This is a list of the tallest buildings in Germany that stand at least  tall. Only habitable buildings are ranked, which excludes radio masts and towers, observation towers, steeples, chimneys and other tall architectural structures. For those, see List of tallest structures in Germany.

Overview 
The construction of high-rise buildings is not common in German cities, and especially not in the city centers, where traditionally steeples are the tallest structures. Due to its economic profile as an international financial centre, only Frankfurt has developed a skyline of high-rise buildings and skyscrapers in its city center. The construction of highrise buildings began 1915 with Zeiss Bau 15 (42 meters) in Jena. The most important examples of early highrises buildings are Wilhelm Marx House in Düsseldorf, Borsigturm and Ullsteinhaus in Berlin, Hansahochhaus in Cologne, Anzeiger-Hochhaus in Hanover, Tagblatt-Turm in Stuttgart and Krochhochhaus & Europahaus (Leipzig) in Leipzig. High-rise buildings can also be found in Berlin, Cologne, Munich, Düsseldorf, Essen, Hamburg, Bonn and Leipzig- but mostly in the outskirts.

Tallest buildings
This includes spires and architectural  details but does not include antenna masts.

Cities with buildings over 100 metres

Tallest demolished buildings

Tallest buildings under construction

Tallest proposed/approved buildings 

This includes spires and architectural details but does not include antenna masts.

Timeline of tallest buildings

See also
 List of tallest buildings in Europe
 List of tallest buildings in the European Union
 List of tallest buildings in Frankfurt
 List of tallest buildings in Berlin
 List of tallest buildings in Hamburg

External links

References

 Germany